Eta Sigma Phi is a collegiate honor society for the study of Classics. It grew out of a local undergraduate classical club founded by a group of students in the Department of Greek at the University of Chicago in 1914.  This organization later united with a similar organization at Northwestern University and became Phi Sigma.  Phi Sigma became a national fraternity in 1924, organizing chapters at leading colleges and universities.

On May 14, 1927, Phi Sigma became Eta Sigma Phi, the National Honorary Classical Fraternity, and was incorporated under the laws of the State of Illinois.  Though nominally a fraternity, as an honor society it is open to all genders.

Purpose
The Constitution of Eta Sigma Phi states that the purposes of the society are as follows:

To develop and promote interest in classical study among the students of colleges and universities
To promote closer fraternal relationship among students who are interested in classical study, including inter-campus relationship
To engage generally in an effort to stimulate interest in classical study, and in the history, art, and literature of ancient Greece and Rome.

Motto
The organization's Greek motto, φιλοσοφοῦμεν καὶ φιλοκαλοῦμεν (English transliteration: "philosophoûmen kaì philokaloûmen"), translates into "We love wisdom and beauty." The saying is a paraphrase from Pericles' famous funeral oration delivered to his fellow Athenians.

Eligibility

Chapters
Local chapters are chartered at liberal arts colleges and universities which are on the accredited list of the Association of American Universities or the recognized regional accrediting agency.  Normally the institution will offer a major in Classics.

Faculty
Faculty who did not join Eta Sigma Phi as undergraduates may be elected as honorary members of the local chapter at their institution.

Students
Student's college or university has an active, officially chartered chapter.

National:
Completion with "A" average or above in a Latin and/or Ancient Greek course.

Local:
Completion with "A" average or above in any one classical studies course and enrollment in another expecting the same, or a "B" average or above in any two courses in classical studies.

Types of Membership
There are three categories of membership:

Active membership
Limited to undergraduates who are enrolled in classes in Latin and/or Greek in the original languages.  A student must meet the basic qualification of an attained grade of not less than "B" in courses in Latin and Greek, with completion of at least one semester or two quarters.  The chapters are permitted considerable autonomy in any additional requirements for membership; however, the grade standard stated above must be observed, and it is expected that chapters will maintain even higher standards.

Associate membership
Open to graduate students who were undergraduate members of Eta Sigma Phi and graduate students in Classics elected under the requirements of membership.

Honorary membership
Conferred upon persons selected by the chapter for their interest in the Classics and contributions to the understanding and appreciation of classical languages, history, and culture.

Organization
Eta Sigma Phi is an undergraduate society, and its officers are active (undergraduate) members who are elected to office for a period of one year by the annual national convention.  Currently, the officers are: Debeaux Bownman of Eta Zeta at Truman State University, Megale Prytanis (President); Eva Leaverton of Theta Tau at Stockton University, Megale Hyparchos (Vice President); Grace Robbins of Eta at Florida State University, Megale Grammateus (Secretary); and Sophia Picard of Eta Zeta at Truman State University, Megale Chrysophylax (Treasurer). The finances of the society are managed by a Board of Trustees, composed of five faculty members from active chapters who are elected for a period of three years. The Current Chairperson of the Board is Dr. Antonios Augoustakis of Alpha Kappa at the University of Illinois, Urbana-Champaign.  This Board also administers the contests and scholarship program. The Executive Secretary is a faculty member of an active chapter who is responsible for carrying out the policies of the society and is required to perform the duties usually assigned to this position. The current Executive Secretary is Dr. Katherine Panagakos, Theta Tau at Stockton University.

Works and Activities
The value of Eta Sigma Phi is revealed particularly in the work of local chapters and the effect of the society upon individual members and upon the academic community.  Although Eta Sigma Phi is "honorary" in nature, chapters usually must utilize programs or activities to carry out the purposes of the society.  Groups of chapters use regional conferences as a means of stimulating interest and exchanging ideas.

At the national level, Eta Sigma Phi sponsors the following activities:

Scholarships
Each year the society awards two scholarships for study abroad during the summer, one to the American School of Classical Studies at Athens and the other to the American Academy in Rome, to members who have recently graduated.  A third scholarship, to a session of the Vergilian Society at Cumae, is also offered, with preference going to rising juniors and seniors.

Contests
Each year the society sponsors contests among college and university students to encourage the study of Latin and Greek on the college level.  Participation in the contests is limited to colleges and universities in which there are Eta Sigma Phi chapters. The contests are in Greek translation, Latin translation, and Latin prose composition.

Medals
The society makes available to high school teachers inexpensive medals to award to outstanding students.  Many Eta Sigma Phi chapters also award the medals in local high schools.  These medals are intended to encourage the study of Latin in high school.

Newsletter
NUNTIUS is the official publication of Eta Sigma Phi, published two times each year.  It contains information concerning the society, original articles by members, announcements, and accounts of the activities of the chapters.

National Convention
The Constitution provides for a national convention each year, late in March or in April.  At this time, delegates conduct the business of the society, including the election of national officers, and workshops are held.  Local chapters bid to host the convention, and an effort is made to move the site from region to region to accommodate chapters in different parts of the country.

Fees

National
There is a charter fee (currently $75) paid to the national office to establish a new chapter.  The only charge for active (undergraduate) membership imposed by the national office is an initiation fee (currently $40 per active member).  For this fee an active member receives a membership card, a membership certificate, and a subscription to NUNTIUS during the remainder of his or her undergraduate years.  Associate members pay a fee of $20 or $30, and honorary members pay no fees.  There are additional charges for NUNTIUS subscriptions and membership certificates for associate and honorary members.  There are no annual dues to the national organization.

Local
Local chapters may impose an additional initiation charge and/or dues, as well as conduct fund-raising activities, to support their operations.

Charter Petitions
The procedure involved in organizing a chapter is as follows:

A petition, executed by a group of qualified undergraduate students and with the endorsement of a faculty member of the appropriate department, is addressed to and filed with the Executive Secretary.
The petition is submitted to the Grand Executive Council, composed of the national officers, for consideration.
If the petition is approved by the Grand Executive Council, it is submitted to the national convention for final action.
If the petition is approved by delegates to the national convention, installation of the new chapter may take place upon payment of the charter fee and initiation fee for each person to be initiated.  The Executive Secretary designates a person or group to officiate at the installation of the new chapter.
A petition should reach the Executive Secretary by February 15 of any year to be considered at the next national convention. The form for petitioning for chapters is enclosed.
It is suggested that the local Classical Club be used as a nucleus for forming a chapter of Eta Sigma Phi.  If there is not such an organization on your campus, it is suggested further that such a club be formed prior to petitioning for a charter.

Campus ΗΣΦ Chapters
 List of ESP campus chapters and links to chapter websites

See also
National Senior Classical League - the college level affiliate of the high school populated and operated National Junior Classical League.

References

External links
Eta Sigma Phi National Organization

Honor societies
1914 establishments in Illinois
Student societies in the United States
Classical associations and societies
Student organizations established in 1914